This is a list of small shelly fossils of prehistoric marine animals, ordered by their type.

Whole-organism 

Namacalathus

Monoplacophoran-like 
Yochelsoniella

Scleritome elements 
Elements of a scleritome, 
Halkieria

Probable palaeoscolecid worm sclerites:
Palaeoscolex
Maikhanella

Tomotiid-like sclerites:
Micrina
Eccentrotheca

Conical 
Problematic cones: 
Cyrtochites
Paradoxiconus

Probable Lobopodian sclerites: 
Rhombocorniculum
Rushtonites
Mongolitubulus

Net-like 
Microdictyon
Onychodictyon
Quadrataporata

Sponge spicule-like 
Chancelloria

Tubular 
Sinotubulites
Anabarites
Hyolithellus
Torellella

See also

References

Inline citations

Resources referenced
 A further list available in 
 More in 
 

small shelly
small shelly
.